Robert Vehe (born August 20, 1953) is an American former cyclist. He competed in the 1000m time trial event at the 1976 Summer Olympics.

References

External links
 

1953 births
Living people
American male cyclists
Olympic cyclists of the United States
Cyclists at the 1976 Summer Olympics
Cyclists from Chicago